King of the Monsters may refer to:
 King of the Monsters (video game), a 1991 video game
 King of the Monsters 2, a 1992 video game
 Godzilla, King of the Monsters!, a 1956 film co-produced in the United States and Japan
 Godzilla, King of the Monsters (comic book), a comic book series published by Marvel Comics
 Godzilla: King of the Monsters in 3D, an unproduced American film
 Godzilla: King of the Monsters (2019 film), a 2019 American film

See also
 Godzilla, nicknamed "the King of the Monsters"